The 2000 America East Conference baseball tournament was held from May 18 through 20 at Frawley Stadium in Wilmington, Delaware. The top four regular season finishers of the league's eight teams qualified for the double-elimination tournament. In the championship game, first-seeded Delaware defeated fourth-seeded Northeastern, 4-2, to win its third consecutive and fifth overall tournament championship. As a result, Delaware received the America East's automatic bid to the 2000 NCAA Tournament.

Seeding 
The top four finishers from the regular season were seeded one through four based on conference winning percentage only. They then played in a double-elimination format. In the first round, the one and four seeds were matched up in one game, while the two and three seeds were matched up in the other.

Results

All-Tournament Team 
The following players were named to the All-Tournament Team.

Most Outstanding Player 
Delaware outfielder Vince Vukovich was named Most Outstanding Player.

Notes

References 

America East Conference Baseball Tournament
Tournament
College baseball tournaments in Delaware
Sports competitions in Wilmington, Delaware
America East Conference baseball tournament
America East Conference baseball tournament